El Guásimo may refer to:
El Guásimo, Colón
El Guásimo, Los Santos